Gallatin County is a county located in the U.S. state of Illinois. According to the 2020 census, it has a population of 4,946, making it the third-least populous county in Illinois. Its county seat is Shawneetown. It is located in the southern portion of Illinois known locally as Little Egypt. Located at the mouth of the Wabash River, Gallatin County, along with neighboring Posey County, Indiana, and Union County, Kentucky form the tri-point of the Illinois-Indiana-Kentucky Tri-State Area.

History
Salt production served as the state's first major industry in the early 19th century. Saltworks developed first by Native Americans, and the French had settled at the Great Salt Spring on the south side of the Saline River, about five miles downstream from Equality. Beginning in 1803, salt works were also developed at Half Moon Lick, southwest of Equality on the north side of the Saline River. Half Moon Lick is now on private land, but the Great Salt Springs are on public lands in the Shawnee National Forest, about one mile west of the Saline River bridge across Illinois Route 1 on Salt Well Road.

Gallatin county was organized in 1812 from land formerly in Randolph County. It was named for Albert Gallatin, who was then Secretary of the Treasury. The bank at Shawneetown was the first in Illinois. It was originally in the John Marshall House, which has been rebuilt and serves as the museum of the Gallatin County Historical Society. This should not be confused with the  State Bank of Illinois building, which is a state historic site a block away in Old Shawneetown

Geography

The Wabash and Ohio rivers join in the northeastern part of the county. The Saline River is a major drainage in the county, and it feeds into the Ohio River.

Climate and weather

Major highways
  U.S. Highway 45
  Illinois Route 1
  Illinois Route 13
  Illinois Route 141
  Illinois Route 142

Adjacent counties
 White County - north
 Posey County, Indiana - northeast
 Union County, Kentucky - east
 Hardin County - south
 Saline County - west
 Hamilton County - northwest

National protected area
 Shawnee National Forest (part)

Government
Gallatin County government is led by a five-member county board. In addition, the county is divided into ten townships.

Politics

As the most culturally Southern of all Illinois counties, Gallatin County was pro-Confederate during the Civil War and even provided a few volunteers to the Confederate Army. It then became solidly Democratic for the next century and a third, voting Republican only in the GOP landslides of 1920, 1952, 1972 and 1980. Even in those four elections, no Republican candidate received more than Richard Nixon’s 53.7 percent in his 3,000-plus-county 1972 triumph.

Since 2000, Gallatin County has followed the same political trajectory as Tennessee, Missouri, Kentucky, West Virginia and Appalachian regions of adjacent states, whereby the Democratic Party’s liberal views on social issues have produced dramatic swings to the Republican Party amongst its almost entirely Southern white population. Over the five elections from 2000 to 2016, Gallatin County has seen a swing of 84 percentage points to the Republican Party – an average of 17 percentage points per election – so that Hillary Clinton’s 24.3 percent vote share in 2016 is barely half the worst Democratic percentage from before 2010. However, despite its sharp rightward turn, it followed the wave in 2008 within the state that elected Barack Obama president, who remains the last Democrat to win the county in a presidential election.

In 1994, Gallatin County was the only one in the state to vote for the Democratic candidate for governor. It voted for the Democrat in every gubernatorial election from 1924 to 2006, finally flipping in 2010 and then voting Republican again in 2014 and 2018.

Demographics

2010
Whereas according to the 2010 census:
 97.9% White
 0.2% Black
 0.3% Native American
 0.1% Asian
 0.0% Native Hawaiian or Pacific Islander
 1.2% Two or more races
 1.2% Hispanic or Latino (of any race)

2000
As of the 2010 census, there were 5,589 people, 2,403 households, and 1,556 families residing in the county. The racial makeup of the county was 97.9% white, 0.3% American Indian, 0.2% black or African American, 0.1% Asian, 0.4% from other races, and 1.2% from two or more races. Those of Hispanic or Latino origin made up 1.2% of the population. In terms of ancestry, 23.6% were German, 22.9% were Irish, 10.7% were English, and 7.0% were American.

Of the 2,403 households, 26.8% had children under the age of 18 living with them, 50.6% were married couples living together, 10.0% had a female householder with no husband present, 35.2% were non-families, and 31.1% of all households were made up of individuals. The average household size was 2.32 and the average family size was 2.87. The median age was 44.4 years.

The median income for a household in the county was $38,003 and the median income for a family was $48,892. Males had a median income of $38,801 versus $22,425 for females. The per capita income for the county was $21,537. About 12.4% of families and 18.0% of the population were below the poverty line, including 22.9% of those under age 18 and 14.9% of those age 65 or over.

Communities

City
 Shawneetown

Villages
 Equality
 Junction
 New Haven
 Old Shawneetown
 Omaha
 Ridgway

Unincorporated communities

 Cottonwood
 Elba
 Kedron
 Lawler

Townships

 Asbury
 Bowlesville
 Eagle Creek
 Equality
 Gold Hill
 New Haven
 North Fork
 Omaha
 Ridgway
 Shawnee

See also
 National Register of Historic Places listings in Gallatin County, Illinois

References

Further reading
 1887. History of Gallatin, Saline, Hamilton, Franklin and Williamson Counties, Illinois. Chicago: Goodspeed Publishing Co.
 Musgrave, Jon, ed. 2002. Handbook of Old Gallatin County and Southeastern Illinois. Marion, Ill.: IllinoisHistory.com. 464 pages.
 Musgrave, Jon. 2004, Rev. ed. 2005. Slaves, Salt, Sex & Mr. Crenshaw: The Real Story of the Old Slave House and America's Reverse Underground R.R.. Marion, Ill.: IllinoisHistory.com. 608 pages.
 Waggoner, Horace Q., interviewer. 1978. "Lucille Lawler Memoir" Shawneetown Bank Project. Sangamon State University. Springfield, Ill.

External links
 History of Gallatin County http://www.rootsweb.com/~ilgallat/gch.htm
 History of Gallatin County and its Communities https://web.archive.org/web/20060413162609/http://www.lth6.k12.il.us/schools/gallatin/communities.htm

 
Illinois counties
1812 establishments in Illinois Territory
Illinois counties on the Ohio River
Southern Illinois
Pre-statehood history of Illinois
Populated places established in 1812